County routes in Columbia County, New York, are signed with the Manual on Uniform Traffic Control Devices-standard yellow-on-blue pentagon route marker. All roads maintained by Columbia County are assigned a county highway number; this number is unsigned. Each county route comprises one or more county highways; however, not all county highways are part of a signed county route.

County routes

County highways
Every county-maintained road is assigned an unsigned county highway number for inventory purposes. The majority of county highways are part of signed county routes; however, some are not posted with any designation. Those highways or parts of highways that are not part of any county routes are listed below.

See also

County routes in New York
List of former state routes in New York (201–300)

Notes

References

External links
Empire State Roads – Columbia County Roads